Loud Hailer may refer to:

 Megaphone
 Loud Hailer (album)